This is a list of episodes of the UK sitcom Desmond's.

Series 1 (5 January - 9 February 1989)
Series One aired on Thursdays at 8:30pm.

Series 2 (22 January - 16 April 1990)
Series Two aired on Mondays at 8:30pm.

Series 3 (28 October 1991 - 3 February 1992)
Series Three aired on Mondays at 8:30pm.

Series 4 (5 October - 28 December 1992)
Series Four aired on Mondays at 8:30pm.

Series 5 (27 September - 20 December 1993)
Series Five aired on Mondays at 8:30pm. Series 5 also saw the start of a new theme tune, with remixed instrumentation and an updated opening sequence.

Series 6 (26 September – 19 December 1994)
The sixth and final series aired on Mondays at 8:30pm. Series 6 was the final series prior to the death of actor Norman Beaton who died six days before the final episode was transmitted.

Desmond's